The Rolls-Royce Wraith is a full-size ultra-luxury car/grand tourer manufactured by Rolls-Royce Motor Cars and based on the chassis of the Rolls-Royce Ghost, shares its name with the 1938 model by the original Rolls-Royce company.

The body style is a two-door pillar-less coupe with iconic suicide doors, where all side windows can roll down like in a convertible.  This body style was popular in American cars during the 1950s and 1960s, and was known as the hardtop body style, not used by Rolls-Royce since 1955.

Overview 
The Rolls-Royce Wraith was built in order to replace the earlier 2-door car model, the Rolls-Royce Phantom Coupé, built on the basis of the Rolls-Royce Ghost, unlike the earlier model which was based on the 7th Generation Rolls-Royce Phantom, the flagship car model of Rolls-Royce Motor cars until the arrival of the 8th Generation. It is the fastest car made by Rolls-Royce Motor Cars.

Initial release

Wraith (2013–2022)
The vehicle was announced in January 2013 and unveiled at the 2013 Geneva Motor Show. Deliveries began from the fourth quarter of 2013.

Specifications and performance

Specifications

Engines

Transmissions

Performance 
The standard Wraith has a 6.6 litre, turbo-charged V12 engine which delivers . The car has the ability to reach a top speed of  making it the fastest accelerating Rolls-Royce ever produced.

Variants

Black Badge

The Wraith Black Badge is a special edition of the Wraith which is performance based.  Its exterior features are painted black (including the Spirit of Ecstasy), and its interior consists of carbon fibre applications.

In addition, the Black Badge moniker has been applied to the Rolls-Royce Cullinan and the Rolls-Royce Dawn.

Landspeed Edition

Unveiled online alongside the Rolls-Royce Dawn Landspeed in June 2021, the Landspeed Edition is a limited version of the Wraith Black Badge made to pay homage to Captain George E.T. Eyston.

The interior bears new features, such as Eyston's OBE, Military Cross and Chevalier de la Légion.

The production is limited to thirty-five Wraith Landspeed motor cars.

Kryptos
It is a special edition of the Rolls-Royce Wraith. Deriving from ancient Greek, the name 'Kryptos' refers to all that is concealed.

Designed as a homage to the clandestine world of cryptology, this car's production is limited to 50 units.

Special editions made by car tuners

Mansory Wraith 
It is a car modified by the German car modification firm Mansory based on the Rolls-Royce Wraith. It was unveiled at the Geneva Motor Show, 2014.

The car has new exterior features such as the new rim system, front grille modification and new lower bodywork while the interior features include new carbon fibre applications and the traditional Mansory marble-coloured appliances are also available.
 
The engine of the original car has been tuned so that the car has the ability to accelerate from 0 to 100 km/h (60 mph) in 4.4 seconds.

Mansory Wraith Bleurion 
The Mansory Wraith has a Special edition called the Mansory Wraith Bleurion which has black coloured exterior features such as the front grille etc, comes in blue colour exterior colour (including the Spirit of Ecstasy) and its interior is also blue colour based.

The Bleurion has the same engine used in the Wraith and has the same capabilities.

Mansory Wraith 2
The  Wraith 2 is a car based on the Rolls-Royce Wraith modified by the German car modification firm Mansory. Its bodywork is identical to the bodywork of the Wraith Bleurion.

The car's interior and exterior features are painted gold and the car has a new rim system. It has gold palm seats stitched on the seats which gives it the name "Palm Edition 999".

Novitec Wraith Overdose 
The Novetic Wraith Overdose is a car made on the basis of the Rolls-Royce Wraith by the German car modification company, Novitec Group.

This car has new exterior lower bodywork and the suspension has been lowered. It also has a special stainless-steel sport exhaust system with electronic sound management.

The Overdose comes in a limited special edition of just eight vehicles.

See also
Rolls-Royce Ghost
BMW 7 Series (F01)

References

External links

 .
 .

Wraith (2013)
Cars introduced in 2013
Coupés
Grand tourers